The Commission scolaire Henri-Bourassa is a former school division that was located in the Laurentides region of the Canadian province of Quebec.

References 

Historical school districts in Quebec